Eastern Slovakia is one of the four NUTS-2 Regions of Slovakia. It was created at the same time as were the Košice and Prešov regions. Eastern Slovakia is the least developed of the four NUTS-2 regions of Slovakia, with its GDP per capita being 54% of the European Union average (€16,300 per year).

References

NUTS 2 statistical regions of Slovakia
NUTS 2 statistical regions of the European Union